Mentor Township is a civil township of Oscoda County in the U.S. state of Michigan. The population was 1,143 at the 2010 census.

Communities 
The settlement formed around the J. E. Potts Salt & Lumber Company, and a post office named Potts opened on June 3, 1886. The H. M. Loud & Sons Lumber Company bought the mill and transformed the community's resources toward lumbering. Potts became a thriving lumber town, and the post office was renamed McKinley on January 28, 1892. The town's railroad repair shops burned in 1900, and with the depletion of the area's lumber supply, the town economy was never rebuilt. The post office closed on September 30, 1913.
 Mio is an unincorporated community and census-designated place in the northwest part of the township along the boundary between Mentor and Big Creek Township.  Mio serves as the county seat of Oscoda County.

Geography 
According to the United States Census Bureau, the township has a total area of 142.8 square miles (369.8 km2), of which 142.1 square miles (368.0 km2) is land and 0.7 square mile (1.8 km2) (0.49%) is water. The civil township comprises four survey townships: Townships 25 and 26 North in Ranges 3 and 4 East.

Demographics 
As of the census of 2000, there were 1,220 people, 553 households, and 374 families residing in the township.  The population density was 8.6 per square mile (3.3/km2).  There were 1,357 housing units at an average density of 9.6 per square mile (3.7/km2).  The racial makeup of the township was 96.23% White, 0.08% African American, 1.56% Native American, 0.16% Asian, 0.49% from other races, and 1.48% from two or more races. Hispanic or Latino of any race were 1.89% of the population.

There were 553 households, out of which 21.7% had children under the age of 18 living with them, 55.9% were married couples living together, 8.9% had a female householder with no husband present, and 32.2% were non-families. 27.7% of all households were made up of individuals, and 11.8% had someone living alone who was 65 years of age or older.  The average household size was 2.21 and the average family size was 2.65.

In the township the population was spread out, with 19.9% under the age of 18, 5.7% from 18 to 24, 22.1% from 25 to 44, 29.8% from 45 to 64, and 22.5% who were 65 years of age or older.  The median age was 46 years. For every 100 females, there were 100.0 males.  For every 100 females age 18 and over, there were 95.4 males.

The median income for a household in the township was $26,094, and the median income for a family was $27,784. Males had a median income of $30,000 versus $20,417 for females. The per capita income for the township was $14,392.  About 11.2% of families and 14.1% of the population were below the poverty line, including 22.1% of those under age 18 and 6.9% of those age 65 or over.

Notes 

Townships in Oscoda County, Michigan
Townships in Michigan